Emmy Auguste Elisabeth Gotzmann (19 March 1881 – 27 September 1950) was a painter from Germany and a member of the Ekensund Artists' Colony.

Biography 
Emmy Gotzmann was born in Frankfurt am Main in 1881. She was the daughter of Klara, née Kammer, and Theodor Gotzmann, a director of the Reichsbank. She was educated at the Krahmersche girls' school. In 1901 she studied in Berlin with Max Uth at his school for women painters and at the Association of Berlin Artists where she was taught by Hans Baluschek and Martin Brandenburg. In 1901 and 1902 she went on study trips to Teterow and then to Penzlin, both in Mecklenburg-Vorpommern. The following year she went to Ekensund.

From 1903 to 1909 she was a member of the Ekensund Artists' Colony. She worked with Otto Heinrich Engel who had been in the area since 1896. She painted watercolours. She was his friend and she appeared in his paintings. She was also a model for a bust by the sculptor Heinz Weddig (1870-1946) who lived in Flensburg, and she lodged at his house from 1905.

In 1908 Gotzmann was given a solo exhibition at the Flensburg Museum of decorative arts. The reviews of the work commented on the strong colours and painterly works and noting that the paintings were bold and masculine.

Gotzmann was a long term member of the Association of Berlin Artists and from 1928 to 1930 she chaired the top committee. She first exhibited with them in 1906 and then on about a dozen occasions with the final entry in 1942. She is seen in the tradition of Van Gogh and the pointillists.

Private life

Gotzmann was first married, in 1905, to the lawyer Walter Conrad and this marriage lasted until 1913 when she married the actor Ludwig Hardt.

Selected exhibitions 
 1902/1903: Berlin Secession for the Drawing Arts
 1908: Flensburg Museum of Applied Arts (today )
 1909: Schleswig-Holstein Art Association
 1909: Kunsthalle Kiel
 1910: Munich Glass Palace
 1912: German Association of Artists
 1912: Kunsthalle Bremen
 1912: XXIV. Berlin Secession
 1919: Anniversary exhibition of the Schleswig-Holstein Art Cooperative
 1928: Kunstgewerbemuseum Berlin

References

External links
 

1881 births
1950 deaths
20th-century German women artists
Artists from Frankfurt
German women painters